The Bangladesh national cricket team toured Sri Lanka from March 2017 to April 2017. The tour consisted of a series of two Test matches, three One Day Internationals (ODIs) and two Twenty20 internationals (T20Is). The second Test match of the tour was the 100th Test played by Bangladesh. The tour also featured a two-day warm-up match ahead of the Test fixtures and a one-day warm-up match ahead of the ODIs. The Test series was played for the Joy Bangla Cup in honour of the father of the Bangladesh nation, Bangabandhu Sheikh Mujibur Rahman.

Before the series, Sri Lanka's captain Angelo Mathews was ruled out of the Test matches with a hamstring injury. Rangana Herath was named as captain in his place. Mathews failed to recover in time for the ODI and T20I series, with Upul Tharanga named captain of the team for both formats.

The Test series was drawn 1–1, with Bangladesh winning the second match by 4 wickets. It was their first win against Sri Lanka in a Test match. The victory was their ninth win in Tests and their fourth overseas. The ODI series was drawn 1–1, with the second of the third match ending in a no result, due to rain. The T20I series also finished 1–1.

After the conclusion of the ODI series, Bangladesh's captain, Mashrafe Mortaza, was suspended for one match for maintaining a slow over-rate in the third game. Therefore, he did not play in Bangladesh's first fixture of the 2017 Ireland Tri-Nation Series in May 2017. During the coin toss of the first T20I, Mashrafe announced his retirement from T20Is following the conclusion of the series.

Squads

Bangladesh's captain Mushfiqur Rahim was asked to play as a batsman only, with Litton Das becoming the wicket-keeper for the Test series. However, Das suffered a fractured rib during training ahead of the second Test, with Mushfiqur Rahim returning as the wicket-keeper for the final Test. Kusal Perera was ruled out of Sri Lanka's squad for the first two ODI matches, but he was expected to be fit for the third and final match. Mehedi Hasan was added to Bangladesh's ODI squad before the start of the limited-overs series. Niroshan Dickwella suffered a fracture to his hand in the first ODI and was ruled out of the rest of the series. Dilruwan Perera, Nuwan Kulasekara and Nuwan Pradeep were all added to Sri Lanka's ODI squad. Kusal Perera was included in Sri Lanka's T20I squad, subject to fitness, with Sandun Weerakkody added as cover, if needed.

Tour matches

Two-day match: Sri Lanka Cricket President's XI v Bangladesh

One-day match: Sri Lanka Cricket President's XI v Bangladesh

Test series

1st Test

2nd Test

ODI series

1st ODI

2nd ODI

3rd ODI

T20I series

1st T20I

2nd T20I

References

External links
 Series home at ESPN Cricinfo

2017 in Bangladeshi cricket
2017 in Sri Lankan cricket
Bangladeshi cricket tours of Sri Lanka
International cricket competitions in 2016–17